Ciarán Brady is an Irish Gaelic footballer who plays for the Cavan county team. He plays his club football with Arva.

Playing career

Club
Brady joined the Arva club at a young age and played with the club at all age levels. Due to low numbers, they often amalgamated with neighbouring club Killeshandra at underage level.

Brady later joined the clubs senior team, and played when Arva reached the Junior final in 2013 but lost by a point to Kill Shamrocks.

The next year Arva were back in the final, this time against Ballymachugh. They made no mistake this time, coming out winners on a 2–11 to 0-8 scoreline.

Arva were promoted and competed in the Intermediate Championship in 2015. In the semi-final, Brady scored an injury-time goal against Belturbet to send Arva into the final against Ballyhaise. Brady scored 2 points on the day  but it wasn't enough as Arva succumbed to a 2–13 to 1–14 defeat.

Remarkably, Arva reached their fourth consecutive championship final in 2016, where they faced Killinkere. Brady scored 1-2 as the game ended in a draw. In the replay, Brady scored 2 points as Arva won by a point to win their first Intermediate title in 33 years.

Arva found themselves back at Junior level in 2022, and reached the final against Drumlane. Brady scored a point but Drumlane came out 1-12 to 2-8 winners.

Inter-county

Minor and U-21
On 17 July 2011, Brady lined out for the Cavan minor team in the Ulster final against Armagh. A 0–12 to 1–6 victory gave Brady an Ulster Minor medal.

Brady joined the Under-21 side in 2013, and played in the Ulster Final against Donegal. Cavan were winners on a 0–13 to 1-6 scoreline. Brady later lined out in the All-Ireland semi-final against Cork, where they suffered a one-point defeat.

Cavan reached the Ulster Final again in 2014, and once again played Donegal. A 2–6 to 0–8 win gave Brady his second Under-21 Championship. Cavan later lost a controversial All-Ireland semi-final to eventual winners Dublin.

A defeat to Donegal in the first round in 2015 ended Brady's underage career with Cavan.

Senior
Brady joined the Cavan senior squad in 2015. On 24 May 2015 he made his championship debut as a substitute in a loss to Monaghan in the Ulster championship. On 20 June 2015 made his first championship start in a qualifier win against London.

Ahead of the 2018 season, manager Mattie McGleenan named Brady as vice-captain of the team, with Dara McVeety as captain.

On 2 June 2019 Brady was sent off in the Ulster semi-final against Armagh, the game finished as a draw. He was suspended for the replay which Cavan won. On 23 June 2019, Brady started in the Ulster Final against Donegal, but it was not Cavan's day as they fell to a five-point defeat.

On 22 November 2020, Cavan met Donegal in the Ulster Final for the second year in a row. Brady scored a point as Cavan stunned Donegal to win their first Ulster title since 1997. Cavan exited the championship to Dublin at the semi-final stage. He ended the season by being nominated for an All-Star award.

On 22 May 2021, Brady started for Cavan in a league match against Longford, but was forced off early in the second half with an injury. Brady missed the rest of the season with a cruciate ligament injury he suffered in the game.

Honours
Cavan
 Ulster Senior Football Championship (1): 2020
 Ulster Under-21 Football Championship (2): 2013, 2014
 Ulster Minor Football Championship (1): 2011

Arva
 Cavan Intermediate Football Championship (1): 2016
 Cavan Junior Football Championship (1): 2014

Individual
 Irish News Ulster All-Star (1): 2020

References

1994 births
Living people
Cavan inter-county Gaelic footballers